N'Dorola is a department or commune of Kénédougou Province in south-western Burkina Faso. Its capital lies at the town of N'Dorola .

Towns and villages

References 

Departments of Burkina Faso
Kénédougou Province